Virius Orfitus was a Roman statesman who served as Consul in 270 and Praefectus urbi from 273 to 274. He was likely related to Lucius Virius Lupus Iulianus and Lucius Virius Agricola.

References

Imperial Roman consuls
3rd-century Romans
Year of birth unknown
Year of death unknown
Virii